The 2019–20 Nemzeti Bajnokság I (also known as 2019–20 OTP Bank Liga), also known as NB I, was the 121st season of top-tier football in Hungary. The league was officially named OTP Bank Liga for sponsorship reasons. Ferencváros were the defending champions. The season was postponed on 16 March 2020 due to the COVID-19 pandemic and resumed on 23 May.

Teams
MTK Budapest and Szombathelyi Haladás finished the 2018–19 Nemzeti Bajnokság I in the last two places and thus were relegated to NB II division.

The two relegated teams were replaced with the top two teams in 2018–19 Nemzeti Bajnokság II, champion Zalaegerszeg and runner-up Kaposvár, each having the required licence for top-division play.

Stadium and locations
Following is the list of clubs competed in the league this season, with their location, stadium and stadium capacity.

Personnel and kits
All teams are obligated to have the logo of the league sponsor OTP Bank as well as the Nemzeti Bajnokság I logo on the right sleeve of their shirt. Since February 2019, all teams participating in the NB I are sponsored by the national betting office Tippmix.

Note: Flags indicate national team as has been defined under FIFA eligibility rules. Players and Managers may hold more than one non-FIFA nationality.

League table

Standings

Positions by round

The table lists the positions of teams after each week of matches. In order to preserve chronological evolvements, any postponed matches are not included to the round at which they were originally scheduled, but added to the full round they were played immediately afterwards.

Results

Rounds 1–22

Rounds 23–33

Statistics

Top goalscorers

Top assists

Hat-tricks

Clean sheets

Average attendances

See also
2019–20 Magyar Kupa
2019–20 Nemzeti Bajnokság II
2019–20 Nemzeti Bajnokság III

References

External links
  
 Official rules 
 uefa.com

Nemzeti Bajnokság I seasons
1
Hungary
Nemzeti Bajnokság I